Albert Louis Hammond OBE (born 18 May 1944) is a British-Gibraltarian singer, songwriter, and record producer. A prolific songwriter, he also collaborated with other songwriters such as Mike Hazlewood, John Bettis, Hal David, Diane Warren, Holly Knight and Carole Bayer Sager. Hammond's son Albert Hammond Jr. is a guitarist with American band the Strokes.

Hammond wrote commercially successful singles for artists including Celine Dion, Joe Dolan, Aretha Franklin, Whitney Houston, Diana Ross, Leo Sayer, Tina Turner, Glen Campbell, Julio Iglesias, Willie Nelson, Lynn Anderson and Bonnie Tyler, and bands Ace of Base, Air Supply, Blue Mink, Chicago, Heart, Living in a Box, the Carpenters, the Hollies, the Pipkins, Starship, and Westlife. Notable songs co-written by Hammond include "Make Me an Island" and "You're Such a Good Looking Woman" by Joe Dolan, "Nothing's Gonna Stop Us Now" by Starship, "One Moment in Time" sung by Whitney Houston, "The Air That I Breathe", a hit for the Hollies, "To All the Girls I've Loved Before", a Julio Iglesias/Willie Nelson duet, and "When I Need You" by Leo Sayer. In 2015, he received the British Academy's Ivor Novello Award for Outstanding Song Collection.

He is also a solo singer in his own right. His biggest (and only top 20) U.S. Billboard hit was "It Never Rains in Southern California", No. 5 in 1972. Other songs of his include "Down by the River", "The Free Electric Band", "I'm a Train", and "When I'm Gone". For a time, he was part of the Family Dogg, a vocal group with whom he had the hit "A Way of Life". He has also produced for a number of other artists.

Early life and success
Hammond was born in London, after his family had been evacuated from Gibraltar during World War II. Shortly after the war they returned to Gibraltar where he grew up. In 1960, he started in music with Gibraltarian band The Diamond Boys, which had no real commercial success, but played a part in Spain's introduction to pop and rock music. The Diamond Boys performed at the first nightclubs in Madrid to stage modern bands, alongside Spanish rock and roll pioneers such as Miguel Ríos. In 1966, Hammond co-founded the British vocal group the Family Dogg, reaching number 6 on the UK Singles Chart with "A Way of Life" in 1969, taken from the album of the same name.

Professional career
In 1970, at age 26, Hammond moved to the United States, continuing his professional career as a musician. However, he had his greatest commercial success in mainland Europe. He is known for his successful singles of the 1970s, released on Columbia subsidiary Mums Records: "Down by the River", "It Never Rains in Southern California", "The Free Electric Band" (his only single to chart in the UK), "Half a Million Miles from Home", "If You Gotta Break Another Heart", "The Peacemaker", "I Don't Wanna Die in an Air Disaster", "I'm a Train" and "99 Miles from L.A." In 1970, under the name 'Steve & Albert', Hammond joined forces with Steve Rowland for the single "Follow The Bouncing Ball", which they heavily promoted, particularly in the UK, where they appeared on Top Of The Pops and The Basil Brush Show, but the single failed to chart. 

Hammond also wrote songs for others with frequent collaborator Mike Hazlewood. These include "Little Arrows" for Leapy Lee, "Make Me an Island" (1969) (which Hammond himself recorded in a Spanish disco-style in 1979), and "You're Such a Good Looking Woman" (1970) for Joe Dolan, "Gimme Dat Ding" for the Pipkins in 1970 (itself a cover from the Freddie and the Dreamers album Oliver in the Overworld), "Good Morning Freedom" for Blue Mink, "Freedom Come, Freedom Go" for the Fortunes in 1971 and "The Air That I Breathe" which was a hit for the Hollies in 1974. In 1971, Hammond also sang on Michael Chapman's fourth album Wrecked Again, and worked briefly with the Magic Lanterns on recordings of his and Hazlewood's songs, and other material.

Written with Carole Bayer Sager, "When I Need You" was first recorded by Hammond on his 1976 album When I Need You. Produced by Richard Perry, Leo Sayer's version made No. 1 on the UK Singles Chart for two weeks in February 1977. Leo Sayer | full Official Chart History | Official Charts Company Commercially successful worldwide, it reached No. 1 in Canada (RPM Top Singles, also for two weeks), and on the Billboard Hot 100 for a week in May 1977. Leapy Lee released a version of "When I Need You" on his first recording since 1970.

Hammond had success as a singer-songwriter with his Spanish recordings. His releases on Epic Records allowed him to tour every region of Latin America. During this period, he met Manuel Montoya, a CBS Mexico executive, who became his personal manager in 1985.  This led to Hammond's Grammy Award-winning production of Lani Hall's Es Facil Amar, the producer and writer of "Cantaré, Cantarás" (the Latin American equivalent of "We Are the World"), and collaborations with Roberto Livi on recordings by Raphael and Eydie Gormé.

Hammond also had two successful singles in the Philippines during 1981. His songs "When I'm Gone" and "Your World and My World" (from the album of the same title) were popular in the country.

With Hal David, Hammond co-wrote "To All the Girls I've Loved Before", a hit in 1984 for Julio Iglesias and Willie Nelson. Hammond collaborated with Diane Warren on "Nothing's Gonna Stop Us Now", a transatlantic No. 1 in 1987 for Starship, and "I Don't Wanna Live Without Your Love", a hit for Chicago that peaked at No. 3 on the U.S. Billboard Hot 100 chart in 1988. With lyricist John Bettis, Hammond co-wrote "One Moment in Time", the theme song to the 1988 Summer Olympics in Seoul, South Korea, as performed by Whitney Houston.

In 1991, Hammond co-wrote "When You Tell Me That You Love Me" recorded by Diana Ross, which reached No. 2 on the UK Singles Chart. In 2005, Ross recorded the song again, this time as a duet with Westlife. Again the song reached No. 2 in the UK.

He wrote several hits for Tina Turner, including "I Don't Wanna Lose You", "Be Tender with Me Baby", "Way of the World", and "Love Thing". Bonnie Tyler recorded the original version of Hammond/Warren's "Don't Turn Around", a UK No. 1 for Aswad in 1988 and a hit for Ace of Base five years later.

In 2005, he released Revolution of the Heart (where Todd Sharpville was his music director), and the single "This Side of Midnight".

In 2008, Hammond met Kasaan Steigen of the Los Angeles-based Trigger Management who became his personal manager, during which time Hammond collaborated with British singer Duffy and others. Duffy's resulting album, Endlessly, co-written and co-produced by Hammond, was released in November 2010.

In 2010, Hammond also worked on Legend, a new recording of duets of his most successful singles, featuring artists including Elena Paparizou and Bonnie Tyler.  It was released on Sony Spain on 23 November that year.

Personal life 
From his first marriage, Hammond has two children. In 1979, he married Argentinian Claudia Fernández, a former model. They had one son, Albert Hammond Jr., guitarist of the American rock band The Strokes and a successful solo musician.

Awards and recognition
In 1987, Hammond's composition with Diane Warren "Nothing's Gonna Stop Us Now" (recorded by Starship) was nominated for an Oscar, Golden Globe and Grammy Award. In 1988, Hammond won an Emmy Award for the song "One Moment in Time", a song he wrote along with John Bettis.

In 2000, he received the Order of the British Empire (OBE). On 19 June 2008, Hammond was inducted in the Songwriters Hall of Fame.

Half Man Half Biscuit paid tribute to Hammond in their 1986 track "Albert Hammond Bootleg" originally on The Trumpton Riots EP and later added to the 2003 re-release of Back in the DHSS.

In May 2015, Hammond collected the Ivor Novello award for outstanding song collection.

Discography

Songwriting credits
(in alphabetical order of song title)

Other languages
(in alphabetical order of song title)

Other songwriting credits
(in alphabetical order of song title)

"Careless Heart" – written with Roy Orbison and Diane Warren
"Creep" (by Radiohead) – subsequently given co-writing credits (with Mike Hazlewood), due to the song's musical similarity to "The Air That I Breathe"
He co-wrote almost all songs on Welsh singer Duffy's album Endlessly, including Duffy songs "My Boy", "Lovestruck" and "Well, Well, Well"
"Have Mercy" – written with Shelly Peiken for Yazz; was also recorded by Viktor Lazlo on her album Back To Front 
"I Give It All To You" / "I Imagine" – written with Steve Duberry and Lord 'n Elliot and sung by Mary Kiani in 1995
"Loving You (Is a Way of Life)" – co-written with Tom Snow and Franne Golde and recorded by  Australian singer Jon Stevens
"Moonlight Lady" – written by Hammond and Carole Bayer Sager and originally sung by Hammond with a large adaptation from "It Never Rains in Southern California". It was later recorded by Julio Iglesias in his 1984 album 1100 Bel Air Place 
"Oklahoma Sunday Morning" – co-written with Tony Macaulay and Mike Hazlewood, a hit for Glen Campbell
"Once in a Lifetime" – written with Antonina Armato and Dennis Morgan
"Smokey Factory Blues" – written by Hammond and Hazlewood, and recorded by Johnny Cash on his John R. Cash album; was also recorded by Steppenwolf on the Slow Flux album
"Through the Storm" – a duet with Aretha Franklin and Elton John
"Mary was an Only Child" - co-written with Mike Hazlewood sung by Art Garfunkel on his 1973 debut album Angel Clare

See also
 Music of Gibraltar

References

External links

Official website

A profile on Albert Hammond
Albert Hammond – 5 Minute Interview with John Matthew Hall of The Independent, 2009
 

1944 births
Living people
English male singer-songwriters
Spanish-language singers
English emigrants to the United States
Singers from London
Gibraltarian songwriters
English record producers
Gibraltarian emigrants to the United States
Officers of the Order of the British Empire
British soft rock musicians
CBS Records artists